The Ponaganset River is a river in the U.S. state of Rhode Island. There are three dams along the river's length.

Course
The river's source is Ponaganset Reservoir in Glocester, where water still flows naturally out of the lake, unimpeded by a dam. It then flows roughly southeast through Glocester and Foster, then into Scituate to the Scituate Reservoir. The river used to converge with the Moswansicut River to form the North Branch Pawtuxet River in the area that is now flooded by the reservoir.

Crossings
Below is a list of all crossings over the Ponaganset River. The list starts at the headwaters and goes downstream.
Glocester
George Allen Road
Foster
Hartford Avenue (RI 101)
Winsor Road
Pine Tree Road
Old Danielson Pike
Danielson Pike (U.S. 6)
Ram Tail Road
Central Pike
Scituate
Ponaganset Road
Plainfield Pike (RI 14)

Tributaries
In addition to many unnamed tributaries, the following brooks feed the Ponaganset:
Shippee Brook
Winsor Brook
Dolly Cole Brook

See also
List of rivers in Rhode Island
Moswansicut River
North Branch Pawtuxet River
Scituate Reservoir

References

Rivers of Providence County, Rhode Island
Rivers of Rhode Island
Tributaries of Providence River